Sardar Muhammad Mushtaq Khan is a Pakistani politician and Landlord who has been a Member of the National Assembly of Pakistan from 2008 to 2013 and a Member of the Provincial Assembly of Khyber Pakhtunkhwa from 1993 to 1999.

Political career
He was elected to the Provincial Assembly of Khyber Pakhtunkhwa as a candidate for Pakistan Muslim League (N) (PML-N) from Constituency PF-39 (Haripur) in 1993 Pakistani general election. He received 24,867 votes and defeated a candidate of Pakistan Muslim League (J).

He was re-elected to the Provincial Assembly of Khyber Pakhtunkhwa as a candidate for PML-N from Constituency PF-39 (Haripur) in 1997 Pakistani general election. He received 24,287 votes and defeated Raja Aamer Zaman.

He was elected to the National Assembly of Pakistan  as candidate for PML-N for Constituency NA-19 (Haripur) in 2008 Pakistani general election.

In 2012, he left PML-N to join Pakistan Peoples Party (PPP).

He ran for the seat of the National Assembly as candidate for PPP from Constituency NA-19 (Haripur) in 2013 Pakistani general election but was unsuccessful.

He rejoined PML-N in August 2015.

References

Living people
Pakistani MNAs 2008–2013
North-West Frontier Province MPAs 1993–1996
North-West Frontier Province MPAs 1997–1999
Year of birth missing (living people)